In Greek mythology, Cerdo (Ancient Greek: Κερδοῦς means 'gain, profit' or 'the wily one' or 'weasel, vixen') was the nymph-wife of King Phoroneus of Argos and mother of Apis and Niobe. Otherwise, the consort of Phoroneus was called either Cinna, or Teledice (or Laodice) also a nymph, or Perimede, or Peitho and Europe.

According to Graves, Cerdo (‘gain or ‘art’) is one of Demeter's titles; it was applied to her as weasel, or vixen, for both are considered prophetic animals.

Notes

References 

 Apollodorus, The Library with an English Translation by Sir James George Frazer, F.B.A., F.R.S. in 2 Volumes, Cambridge, MA, Harvard University Press; London, William Heinemann Ltd. 1921. ISBN 0-674-99135-4. Online version at the Perseus Digital Library. Greek text available from the same website.
Gaius Julius Hyginus, Fabulae from The Myths of Hyginus translated and edited by Mary Grant. University of Kansas Publications in Humanistic Studies. Online version at the Topos Text Project.
 Pausanias, Description of Greece with an English Translation by W.H.S. Jones, Litt.D., and H.A. Ormerod, M.A., in 4 Volumes. Cambridge, MA, Harvard University Press; London, William Heinemann Ltd. 1918. Online version at the Perseus Digital Library
 Pausanias, Graeciae Descriptio. 3 vols. Leipzig, Teubner. 1903.  Greek text available at the Perseus Digital Library.

Nymphs

Queens in Greek mythology